Lorenzo Perilli is an Italian classicist and academic at the University of Rome Tor Vergata. A Professor of Classical Philology, he is the Director of the interdisciplinary Research Centre in Classics, Mathematics and Philosophy Forms of Knowledge in the Ancient World, established in 2013 and devoted to ancient science and related disciplines. He is Co-director of the periodical Technai. An international journal on ancient science and technology, and serves on the board of the journal of ancient medicine Galenos.

He was educated in Classics at the University of Rome (1983–1989), where he also received his PhD in Philosophy.  He was awarded several international research grants and prizes, among them a 2-year grant from the Alexander von Humboldt Foundation (University of Munich, Germany, 1996), and the Prize of the Italian Ministry of Cultural Heritage in 2001 for his studies on ancient philosophy and science. In 2007 he won the Friedrich Wilhelm Bessel International Research Award in Germany, following a nomination by the Corpus Medicorum Graecorum of the Berlin-Brandenburg Academy of Sciences, where he subsequently conducted his research for about one year. In August 2006 he was research associate at the Wellcome Trust Centre for the History of Medicine at University College London, in 2010 a visiting scholar of the Fonds National Suisse de la Recherche Scientifique at the University of Zurich, in 2013 Petra Kappert Fellow at the University of Hamburg, Centre for the Study of Manuscript Cultures, in 2014 a fellow of the Berliner Antike Kolleg, Berlin, in 2017 Visiting Professor at Venice International University. His work on ancient empiricism has attracted the attention of the mathematician and essayist Nassim N. Taleb at the time when he was writing his best-selling book The Black Swan. He also works as a translator mainly from German, English, French.

Academic Interests
Perilli’s main fields of research include Ancient Greek medicine (Temple medicine, Hippocrates, Galen, empiricism), the history of ideas, Ancient Greek philosophy and science, textual criticism and classical philology. He is also recognised as an expert in humanities computing.

Publications
Perilli’s main publications include among others
Filologia computazionale, Rome, Accademia Nazionale dei Lincei 1995
La teoria del vortice nel pensiero antico, Pisa, Pacini 1996
[https://books.google.com/books?id=pHLVfFtZ3wEC&q=perilli+menodoto Menodoto di Nicomedia]. Contributo a una storia galeniana della medicina empirica, München-Leipzig, Saur 2004
La filosofia antica. Itinerario storico e testuale (with D.P. Taormina), Turin, Utet 2012 
Logos. Theorie und Begriffsgeschichte, Darmstadt, Wissenschaftliche Buchgesellschaft, 2013
Italian edition of R.B. Onians, The origins of European thought, Cambridge 1954 (Milan, Adelphi, 2nd ed., 1998)
Italian edition and translation of G.E.R. Lloyd and N. Sivin, The Way and the Word. Science and Medicine in Ancient China and Greece, Yale UP 2002 (Tao e Logos. Scienza e medicina nell'antichità: Cina e Grecia, Pisa, Edizioni della Normale, 2009)
Italian translation (from Dutch), with introduction, of L.E.J. Brouwer, Leven Kunst en Mystiek, Delft 1905 (Vita, arte e mistica, Milan, Adelphi, 2015) 
(with Luca Canali) I tre volti di Catullo, Milan, Rizzoli 2013
(with Luca Canali) Il rivoluzionario conseguente. Cesare, Augusto, e il secolo estremo della storia di Roma, Rome, Castelvecchi 2015
Vocum Hippocratis Glossarium (Galen’s Hippocratic Glossary), Berlin, Walter De Gruyter 2017 (Corpus Medicorum Graecorum V 13,1)
Ancient Philosophy. Textual paths and historical explorations (ed., with D.P. Taormina), London and New York, Routledge 2017
He contributed many articles to scholarly journals and conference proceedings.

References

External links
 Lorenzo Perilli at the University of Rome ‘Tor Vergata’ (including cv and list of publications) (in Italian)
Lorenzo Perilli at the Berlin-Brandenburg Academy of Sciences: the Friedrich Wilhelm Bessel-Forschungspreis (including short cv) (in German)
  Article by Lorenzo Perilli: Was Forscher wirklich wollen / What Researchers really want. Abstract: Bureaucratic reform notions and modelling on the wrong examples are jeopardising European universities. A plea for some reflection upon classic strengths and more faith in the up-and-coming generation of academics.
 Radio interview with Lorenzo Perilli on ancient Greek medicine from Internet Archive (in Italian)
 Radio interview with Lorenzo Perilli on Galen's anatomy and medical knowledge from Internet Archive (in Italian)

Living people
Italian classical philologists
Year of birth missing (living people)